is a Japanese yonkoma manga series written and illustrated by Yasu Tora. It first appeared in Shueisha's Weekly Young Jump as various one-shot chapters from November 2010 to March 2011 and was then regularly serialized in the magazine from July 2011 to September 2014. Shueisha compiles them into four tankōbon volumes. It was adapted into an original net animation (ONA) in 2013. The manga focuses on the adventures of a middle school girl named Fuuka Saitou known for her height and hair that covered her left eye, earning her the nickname "Saipu" (based on cyclopes).

Plot
Fuuka Saitou, a middle school student known for her nickname "Saipu", has a brother complex towards her brother Hikaru. The story follows their daily lives as she tries to gain his affection through perverted ways.

Characters

Fuuka Saitou is a 14-year-old girl in her second year of junior high (8th grade). Two years before the start of the series, when she was shorter than her brother Hikaru, Fuuka makes a promise that she would grow up and marry him. She has a strong brother complex and is extremely sensitive and jealous of any female affections directed towards him. Fuuka often cosplays as girls that Hikaru liked and teases him with perverted innuendos, although some situations turn out to be innocent wordplay. She is admired by everyone for her model-like figure; she also is a resourceful cook and has excellent grades. When asked the reason for hiding her left eye, Fuuka replies that it hid a dark power.

Hikaru Saitou is Fuuka's older brother and the object of her affection; he is a first-year university student currently living at home with his younger sister. When Fuuka acted cold on him the other day, Hikaru becomes flustered.

Fuuka has several female classmates that she regularly hangs out with:  (voiced by Saki Fujita), who wears pigtails, is strongly perverted that her other classmates often ignore her comments;   (voiced by Kahoru Sasajima), acts as the straight-man as she retorts Rin's perverted comments; Class Representative, who wears glasses and braids and secretly crushes on Fuuka; and Kamiji, a tall girl with short hair who gives off a cool attitude like a delinquent, but is actually soft-spoken and rather self-conscious.

Other recurring characters include: the Saitou parents, who approve of Fuuka's brother complex; Hikaru's college radio club friends Sato and Suzuki, and their flirtatious president Eri, the last of whom causes Fuuka to be extremely jealous; their cousins Akari and Souta Haruno, who conspire to split them apart; and their neighbors the Yamakuras.

Media

Manga
Cyclops Shōjo Saipu, written and illustrated by Yasu Tora, debuted as a series of one-shots in Shueisha's Weekly Young Jump from November 18, 2010, to March 24, 2011. It was then regularly serialized in the magazine from July 7, 2011, to September 25, 2014. Shueisha has compiled its chapters into four tankōbon volumes, released from May 18, 2012, to November 19, 2014.

Volume list

Original net animation
The manga was adapted into an original net animation, which was released from March 12 to  May 30, 2013. Each episode is about 2–3 minutes long and consists of short gags from the manga.

Episode list

Works cited
 "Ch." is shortened form for chapter and refers to a chapter number of the Cyclops Shōjo Saipu manga

References

External links
  
 

2013 anime ONAs
Comedy anime and manga
Incest in anime and manga
Seinen manga
Shueisha manga
Yonkoma